Jalan Changkat Sulaiman (Perak state route A189) is a major road in Perak, Malaysia.

List of junctions 

Slim